Heartfelt is the seventh studio album by Fourplay, released in 2002. This is the first album to be released by Arista Records.

Track listing

Personnel 
Fourplay
 Bob James – keyboards
 Larry Carlton – guitars
 Nathan East – bass guitar, vocals 
 Harvey Mason – drums

Additional Personnel
 Ken Freeman – programming (1-8, 10, 11, 12)
 Christian "Tian" Salyer – programming (9)
 LeDon Bishop – additional backing vocals (5)

Production 
 Fourplay – producers (1-4, 6-12)
 Harvey Mason, Jr. – producer (5)
 Don Murray – engineer (1-4, 6-12), mixing (1-4, 6-12)
 Dave Russell – engineer (5)
 Christian "Tian" Salyer – engineer (5), ProTools engineer (9)
 Ken Freeman – additional engineer (1-4, 6-12), ProTools engineer (1-8, 10, 11, 12)
 Andy Ackland – assistant engineer (1-4, 6-12)
 Derek Carlson – assistant engineer (1-4, 6-12)
 Chris Wonzer – assistant engineer (1-4, 6-12)
 Jon Gass – mixing (5)
 Robert Vosgien – mastering 
 Sammy Sanchez – guitar technician 
 Debbie Johnson – production coordinator
 Kwaku Alston – photography 
 Nathan East – recording studio photography
 Jack Forchette – manager 
 Air Tight Management – management company

Studios
 Recorded at Royaltone Studios (North Hollywood, California) and O'Henry Sound Studios (Burbank, California).
 Mixed at Skip Saylor Recording (Los Angeles, California).
 Mastered at Capitol Mastering (Hollywood, California).

Reception

References 

2002 albums
Fourplay albums
Arista Records albums
Bluebird Records albums